The General Directorate of Civil Aeronautics (DGAC), in , is the civil aviation authority of Guatemala. Its headquarters are on the property of La Aurora International Airport in Zone 13 of Guatemala City.

History
The agency was created under the government of Lázaro Chacón González on 11 September 1929, by government decree 1,032, as a daughter agency of the Ministry of Communications and Public Works, today the Ministry of Communications, Infrastructure, and Housing.

Divisions

The Accident Investigation Section investigates aircraft accidents and incidents.

See also

 Cubana de Aviación Flight 1216

References

External links
 Dirección General de Aeronáutica Civil 
 YouTube channel 

Government agencies of Guatemala
Guatemala
Aviation organizations based in Guatemala
Organizations investigating aviation accidents and incidents
1929 establishments in Guatemala